Herbert Wright may refer to:

 Herb Wright (1917–2015), American scientist
 Herbert Wright (politician) (1880–1944), Canadian politician
 Herbert Wright (producer) (1947–2005), science fiction television producer and writer
 Herbert Wright (botanist)
 Lil Herb (born 1995), American rapper
 Herbert Wright (wrestler)

See also
Bert Wright (disambiguation)